The Société du Jing-lar, or Jing-lar Club, was a club of Japonists founded by Philippe Burty in Paris in 1867.

See also
International Exposition (1867)

References 

Japonisme
1867 establishments in France